Ana María Ortiz (born 1989) is a Bolivian beauty queen and model and Bolivia's delegate to Miss World in 2006.

She was born in Beni in northern Bolivia. She studied political science.

She entered the 2006 contest with Desiree Durán Morales.

References

Bolivian female models
Miss World 2006 delegates
People from Beni Department
Living people
1989 births
Bolivian beauty pageant winners